Salaya is a tambon (sub-district) of Phutthamonthon district, Nakhon Pathom province, central Thailand, to the west of Bangkok and part of the Bangkok Metropolitan Region. In 2017 it had a population of 9,784 people, Salaya contains six mubans (villages).

History 
The word Salaya means 'medicine pavilion'. It got this name because in the reign of King Mongkut (Rama IV), he ordered the digging of a khlong ('canal'), Khlong Maha Sawat through this area and building a salas ('Thai pavilion') on both banks of the khlong.

For Salaya is a pavilion that contains textbooks about traditional Thai medicine for educating the general public, including being a sanatorium as well.

Because it is close to Bangkok, Salaya has many important places such as Phutthamonthon, Utthayan Avenue, Mahidol University, Salaya railway station, Thai Film Archive, and the Naval Education Department.

A local prominent shopping center CentralPlaza Salaya, indeed, it is located in the area of Bang Toei in neighbouring district Sam Phran.

Administration

Central administration
Salaya is divided into six administrative villages:

Local administration
The area of the tambon is shared by two local governments:
 Thesaban tambon (subdistrict municipality)  Salaya (เทศบาลตำบลศายาลา)
 Subdistrict administrative organization (SAO) Salaya (องค์การบริหารส่วนตำบลศาลายา)

See also
Sala Thammasop

References

External links

Tambon of Nakhon Pathom Province